Sparks is an unincorporated community in Bell County, in the U.S. state of Texas. According to the Handbook of Texas, the community had a population of 30 in 2000. It is located within the Killeen-Temple-Fort Hood metropolitan area.

History
The area in what is now known as Sparks today first grew up around a railroad station and was said to be named for a local family who owned the area in the late 19th century. A post office was established at Sparks in 1897 and remained in operation until 1906. There were 61 residents and one business in the community in 1933. It lost almost half of its population in 1964, and a church was located a short distance east of the railroad. Its population remained at 30 in 2000.

Geography

Education
In 1903, Sparks had a school with one teacher and 52 students. Today, the community is served by the Academy Independent School District.

References

Unincorporated communities in Texas
Unincorporated communities in Bell County, Texas